The Hayden Arch Bridge is a concrete arch bridge on old US 14/US 16 near Cody, Wyoming. It is the only example of its kind in Wyoming. Built in 1924–25, the single-span bridge spans  with two smaller approach arches between rock canyon walls. The bridge carries the Cody-Yellowstone Highway across the Shoshone River with a shallow open-spandrel central arch and nominally arched approach spans. The bridge is named after C. E. Hayden, an engineer with the Wyoming State Highway Department, who designed the bridge and supervised its construction. It was built by H. S. Crocker of Denver, Colorado.

See also

List of bridges documented by the Historic American Engineering Record in Wyoming

References

External links
Hayden Arch Bridge at the Wyoming State Historic Preservation Office

Road bridges on the National Register of Historic Places in Wyoming
Bridges completed in 1925
Buildings and structures in Park County, Wyoming
Transportation in Park County, Wyoming
Historic American Engineering Record in Wyoming
U.S. Route 14
U.S. Route 16
Bridges of the United States Numbered Highway System
National Register of Historic Places in Park County, Wyoming
Concrete bridges in the United States
Open-spandrel deck arch bridges in the United States